Daluis is a commune in the Alpes-Maritimes department in southeastern France. Situated on the river Var, it is the end point of the Gorges de Daluis.

Population

See also
Gorges de Daluis
Communes of the Alpes-Maritimes department

References

Communes of Alpes-Maritimes
Alpes-Maritimes communes articles needing translation from French Wikipedia